The title Lord Lyle was a Lordship of Parliament in the Peerage of Scotland created for Sir Robert Lyle of Duchal, a Renfrewshire knight c. 1452. The title became extinct upon the death of the 4th Lord Lyle c. 1551.

Lords Lyle
Robert Lyle, 1st Lord Lyle (d.c. 1470)
Robert Lyle, 2nd Lord Lyle (d.c. 1492) Lord Chief Justice
Robert Lyle, 3rd Lord Lyle (d.c. 1500)
John Lyle, 4th Lord Lyle (d.c. 1551)

References

Notes

Sources
Balfour Paul, Sir James, The Scots Peerage IX vols, Edinburgh 1904. 

Lyle
Lyle